Jules Bélanger (13 November 1929 – 5 February 2021) was a Canadian professor.

Distinctions
Prix Gérard-Morisset (2016)

References

1929 births
2021 deaths
Academics from Quebec
French Quebecers
Université Laval alumni